Hostěnice is a municipality and village in Brno-Country District in the South Moravian Region of the Czech Republic. It has about 800 inhabitants.

Administrative parts
The village of Lhotky is an administrative part of Hostěnice.

References

Villages in Brno-Country District